Holsworthy is a suburb in south-western Sydney, in the state of New South Wales, Australia 31 kilometres south-west of the Sydney central business district, in the local government area of the City of Liverpool.

Holsworthy is most notable for a large Australian Army reserve, Holsworthy Barracks, where training exercises are frequently carried out. The reserve is adjacent to Heathcote Road, which connects to Bankstown, Liverpool, Lucas Heights, Engadine and Heathcote. Signs on the perimeter warn potential trespassers of the use of laser guided and conventional gunfire.

The residential area is located north of the railway station. Anzac Village is a locality in the northern part of the suburb and the adjacent suburb of Wattle Grove. A new development called 'Mornington' has recently been built in this region. A shopping centre has also been built in this area.

History
The area was named after Holsworthy, Devon, England, where Governor Lachlan Macquarie married Elizabeth Campbell, on 3 November 1807. It was originally spelt as Holdsworthy until after World War II, when the 'd' was dropped.

This land was occupied by the Tharawal people. With the arrival of the First Fleet, indigenous people were pushed back from their traditional lands in the area surrounding Sydney. In 1795, explorers George Bass and Matthew Flinders explored the Georges River and in 1798, grants of land for farming were made in the area. The soil was good and crops of corn, wheat and vegetables were soon being harvested.

However, tensions developed with the Tharawal. In 1801, Governor King ordered soldiers to fire on the aborigines to keep them from settler's properties. By 1815, Governor Macquarie declared a state of open warfare against aborigines in the Georges River area and forbade them carrying weapons within a mile of any British settlement. Ultimately, the British prevailed.

A settlement named Eckersley was established in 1835 on what is now military land. By the 1880s a number of vineyards were established in the area. The land was acquired by the army in 1913. During World War I it was home to a large internment camp for civilians of German or Austro-Hungarian background, the camp absorbed prisoners from the infamous Torrens Island Concentration Camp in 1915. The modern village of Holsworthy evolved after World War II to the north, with the barracks to the south.  The streets are named with a military theme, such as Tarakan, Bardia, Wewak, Lae, Brunei, Finschhafen, Madang, Gona, Anzac, Light Horse, Infantry, Cavalry, Sabre, Gunners Row and Trooper Row. In Anzac Village, Australian Generals are remembered with Birdwood, Monash, Bridges and Blamey.

The Holsworthy bushland retains many indigenous sites and has been referred to as "Sydney's Kakadu". There are more than 500 significant Tharawal sites in the area including campsites, tool making sites and rock art. The art is mostly engravings of hands, boomerangs, animals, birds and fish.

Climate
Holsworthy has a humid subtropical climate (Cfa), like most of Sydney, with warm summers and cool to mild winters, and precipitation spread throughout the year. Thunderstorms are common in the summer months, and provide most of the precipitation in that season. Winters are pleasantly cool and sunny, although east coast lows can bring large amounts of rainfall. Snow has never occurred, although frost is a fairly common occurrence in winter.

Population
According to the 2016 census, Holsworthy had a population of 5,476. There were a high number of families with children (76.2%) and the median age of Holsworthy residents (30) was eight years younger than the national median. Not surprisingly, defence was the major industry of employment, covering 16.8% of the suburb's residents. The median family income ($2,179 per week) was substantially higher than the national median ($1,734).

60.4% of people were born in Australia. The next most common countries of birth were India 7.3%, Philippines 3.0%, Indonesia 2.5%, New Zealand 2.2% and China 2.1%. 59.1% of people only spoke English at home. Other languages spoken at home included Hindi 3.0%, Mandarin 2.9%, Indonesian 2.9%, Bengali 2.7% and Arabic 2.4%. The most common responses for religion were Catholic 23.4%, No Religion 22.4%, Anglican 12.6% and Hinduism 10.8%

Transport
 Holsworthy railway station is on the Sydney Trains Airport & South Line. The railway station was opened in 1987 when the East Hills line was extended to Glenfield and Campbelltown.

Pop culture
The Black Balloon, a film starring Toni Collette, Gemma Ward, Erik Thomson and Luke Ford, was filmed in Holsworthy.

Churches

A congregation of Lifegate Community Church (Holsworthy & Wattle Grove) meets weekly in the Wattle Grove Primary Public School Hall on Cressbrook Drive (Holsworthy Church on google maps).

St Christophers Catholic Church at Holsworthy also services the Holsworthy and Wattle Grove area.

References

External links 

  [CC-By-SA]
 Lifegate Community Church (Holsworthy & Wattle Grove)

Suburbs of Sydney
City of Liverpool (New South Wales)